William Sanders (April 28, 1942 - June 29, 2017) was an American speculative fiction writer, primarily of short fiction, and was the senior editor of the now defunct online science fiction magazine Helix SF

Sanders wrote several novels, including Journey to Fusang (1988), The Wild Blue and the Gray (1991) and The Ballad of Billy Badass & the Rose of Turkestan (1999). The first two are alternate histories with a humorous bent while the last is a fantasy novel.

He also wrote a number of mystery novels, including a series featuring Western writer Taggart Roper beginning with The Next Victim (St. Martin's Press 1993), as well as novels marketed by the publisher as Action/Adventure, beginning with Hardball (Berkley Jove 1992).  In an author's afterword to his short story "Ninekiller and the Neterw", included in the Roger Zelazny tribute collection "Lord of the Fantastic", Sanders credits Roger Zelazny for talking Sanders into returning to writing SF/F stories with American Indian themes.

Sanders, a former powwow dancer, is best known for his use of American Indian themes and his dry, often cynical sense of humor. His most-anthologized and perhaps best known work is "The Undiscovered", an alternate history in which Shakespeare is transported to Virginia and writes "Hamlet" for the Cherokee tribe. The story won the Sidewise Award for Alternate History in 1997.  Sanders won a second Sidewise Award for his story Empire in 2002.  Sanders said that he considers his best story to be Dry Bones.

A stickler for detail and accuracy, Sanders studied history, which led to the publication in 2003 of Conquest: Hernando de Soto and the Indians, 1539-1543, a book begun some two decades earlier and researched by travelling extensively in the southeastern quarter of the US, by motorcycle and small boat and on foot, retracing de Soto's probable routes.

As a non-fiction writer, he wrote numerous articles on the martial arts and outdoor sports, as well as books on bicycle racing, kayaking, and backpacking.  As Sundown Slim he wrote a humor column for "Competitive Cycling", a bike racing magazine in the mid 1970s.  He also contributed to Bike World Magazine in the same period.

Sanders and his wife lived in Tahlequah, Oklahoma. Sanders died after a prolonged illness on June 29, 2017.

Bibliography
The Bicycle Racing Book. Domus Books, 1979.  (non-fiction)
Guide to Inflatable Canoes and Kayaks. World Publications, 1979.  (non-fiction)
Backcountry Bikepacking. Stackpole Books, 1982.  (non-fiction)
Kayak Touring. Stackpole Books, 1984.  (non-fiction)
Journey to Fusang. Warner Books, 1988.  (comic alternative history)
Pockets of Resistance. Warner Books, 1990.  written under Will Sundown pseudonym (speculative fiction)
The Hellbound Train. Popular Library, 1991.  written under Will Sundown pseudonym (speculative fiction)
The Wild Blue and the Gray. Warner Books, 1991.  (alternative history)
Steel Wings. Jove Books, 1991.  (mystery)
Hardball. Diamond Books, 1992.  Hardball series (action/adventure)
Aryan Legion. Diamond Books, 1992.  Hardball series (action/adventure)
Skorpion. Diamond Books, 1992.  Hardball series (action/adventure)
The Next Victim. St. Martin's Press, 1993.  Taggart Roper series (mystery)
A Death on 66. St. Martin's Press, 1994.  Taggart Roper series (mystery)
Blood Autumn. St. Martin's Press, 1995.  Taggart Roper series (mystery)
Billy Mitchell's Overt Act. Baen Books, 1998 (short story), (collected in Harry Turtledove's anthology Alternate Generals)
The Ballad of Bill Badass and the Rose of Turkestan. Yandro House, 1999.  (modern fantasy)
The Bernadette Operation. Xlibris Corporation, 2000.  (thriller)
J. iPublish.com, 2001.  (speculative fiction)
Smoke. Wildside Press, 2002.  (mystery)
Are We Having Fun Yet? American Indian Fantasy Stories. Wildside Press, 2002.  (short story collection)
Empire. Baen Books, 2002 (short story), (collected in Harry Turtledove's anthology Alternate Generals II)
Conquest: Hernando de Soto and the Indians, 1539-1543. Wilside Press, 2003.  (non-fiction)
Is It Now Yet? Wildside Press, 2005.  (short story collection)
Not Fade Away. Baen Books, 2005 (short story), (collected in Harry Turtledove's anthology Alternate Generals III)
East of the Sun and West of Fort Smith. Noeilana Books, 2008.  (short story collection)

References

External links
William "Sundown" Sanders's personal page at http://www.mrbadexample.com/sanders/

1942 births
2017 deaths
20th-century American novelists
20th-century American short story writers
21st-century American novelists
21st-century American short story writers
American male novelists
American male short story writers
American science fiction writers
Native American writers
Sidewise Award winners
20th-century American male writers
21st-century American male writers